The 2014 Maryland Terrapins football team represented the University of Maryland, College Park in the 2014 NCAA Division I FBS football season. The Terrapins were led by fourth-year head coach Randy Edsall and played their home games at Byrd Stadium. This marked the Terrapins' inaugural season as a member of the Big Ten Conference and the Big Ten East Division after 61 seasons as a member of the Atlantic Coast Conference.

The non-conference slate included a game against Syracuse, who joined the ACC in 2013 and was part of the Atlantic Division with Maryland in the Terrapins' final season in the ACC, and regional rival West Virginia, in the schools' 51st contest. Maryland finished with a 4–4 record in Big Ten play, placing third in the East Division behind ranked teams Ohio State and Michigan State. Ending the regular season at 7–5, Maryland accepted an invitation to the Foster Farms Bowl, where Stanford defeated the Terrapins, 45–21.

Schedule

Roster

Season summary

Penn State

References

Maryland
Maryland Terrapins football seasons
Maryland Terrapins football